Anthidium quetzalcoatli is a species of bee in the family Megachilidae, the leaf-cutter, carder, or mason bees.

Distribution
Middle America:
Mexico

References

quetzalcoatli
Insects described in 1933